Infamous (Also known as Infamous, Every Word is True) is a 2006 American drama film written and directed by Douglas McGrath. It is based on George Plimpton's 1997 book, Truman Capote: In Which Various Friends, Enemies, Acquaintances, and Detractors Recall His Turbulent Career and  covers the period from the late 1950s through the mid-1960s, during which Truman Capote researched and wrote his bestseller In Cold Blood (1965).

Capote is played by Toby Jones. Sandra Bullock, Daniel Craig, Lee Pace, and Jeff Daniels also have featured roles, with a supporting cast that includes Sigourney Weaver and Hope Davis, and a song performance by Gwyneth Paltrow.

Plot
Truman Capote, known in New York City society for his wit and fashion flair as much as he is recognized in literary circles as the celebrated writer of Other Voices, Other Rooms and Breakfast at Tiffany's, reads a brief article about the murder of a farming family in Holcomb, Kansas, in the back pages of the New York Times of November 16, 1959.

Curious as to how the residents would react to a brutal massacre in their midst, the author and his friend, Nelle Harper Lee, who has just published her novel To Kill a Mockingbird, travel from New York to the rural Midwestern town, ostensibly so Capote can interview people for a magazine article. Once there, he realizes there might be enough material for what he eventually describes as a "nonfiction novel".

Capote's dress and demeanor both amuse and dismay law enforcement officials. He allows the less ostentatious Lee to act as a buffer between himself and those whose trust he needs to gain in order to obtain as much background information as possible.

The Kansas Bureau of Investigation's lead detective on the case, Alvin Dewey, has refused to cooperate with the writer. But when his starstruck wife Marie meets Capote in a grocery store, she invites him and Lee to Christmas dinner. He eventually wins over his host with personal anecdotes about Humphrey Bogart, John Huston, Frank Sinatra, and the like.

As a result, when ex-convicts Richard Hickock and Perry Smith are apprehended in Las Vegas and extradited to Holcomb, permission is given to Capote to interview them in their cells. The two defendants are tried and found guilty, but a lengthy period of appeals begins. Capote's society and literary friends in New York, like Slim Keith and Babe Paley, press him for juicy gossip about the case and inquire when they can expect to read the book.

Capote forms an attachment to Smith. He empathizes with the convicted killer's unhappy childhood, and Smith's remorseful manner, genuine sincerity, and obvious intelligence impress him. The criminal's reciprocal feelings become evident, although Smith has difficulty dealing with his emotions. As soon as Smith learns that Truman plans to title his book In Cold Blood, which suggests the author thinks of him only as a merciless killer, he violently subdues Capote and nearly rapes him.

Smith steadfastly refuses to describe the night of the murders. This greatly angers Capote, who wants to hear details not only as a writer in search of the truth but as someone who finds it difficult to believe a loved one could be guilty of such a crime. Smith eventually acquiesces and discusses what transpired.

Capote then finds himself entangled in a personal and professional dilemma. As much as he wants Smith to be sentenced to life in prison, a death by hanging would provide a far more sensational ending for readers of his book. He begins to unravel psychologically as the legal appeals drag on, unable to complete his book without an ending.

Years go by. Hickock and Smith finally exhaust all their options and now ask that Capote be present at their April 14, 1965 execution. He complies reluctantly with their request. Afterward, he learns Smith bequeathed his meager belongings to him, and among them he finds a charcoal sketch of him the killer had drawn.

Cast

Production

Development
The film's original title alternated between Have You Heard? and Every Word Is True.

The fictional singer portrayed by Gwyneth Paltrow was originally intended to be Peggy Lee. The situation of an audience being held spellbound by a performer falling silent in the middle of a song was based on a real-life nightclub performance by Barbara Cook.

According to writer and director Douglas McGrath, in his DVD commentary, many of the scenes in Infamous occurred only in McGrath's imagination, most notably a dramatic sexual encounter between Capote and inmate Perry Smith (played by Craig).

Release
Infamous premiered at the August 2006 Venice Film Festival. It differs from the earlier Capote in that it occasionally breaks away from the Kansas setting to allow Capote's Manhattan society friends and professional acquaintances to comment on and express opinions about him to an unseen interlocutor during mock interviews. It also is more explicit about the romantic feelings Capote and Perry Smith may have shared.

Reception

Critical reception
The review aggregator website Rotten Tomatoes reported a 74% approval rating with an average rating of 6.7/10 based on 155 reviews. The website's consensus reads, "Though comparisons with last year's Capote may be inevitable, Infamous takes a different angle in its depiction of the author, and stands up well enough on its own." On Metacritic, the film achieved an average score of 68 out of 100, based on 34 critics, signifying "generally favorable reviews".

Much of the critical discussion of the film focused on comparisons with the previous year's Capote, which had received considerable critical acclaim and for which Philip Seymour Hoffman had won the Academy Award for Best Actor for his performance as Capote.

In his review in The New York Times, A.O. Scott called the film "well worth your attention. It is quick-witted, stylish and well acted… warmer and more tender, if also a bit thinner and showier, than Capote… it is in the end more touching than troubling."

Rex Reed of The New York Observer opined, "They gave the Oscar to the wrong Truman Capote. I do not begrudge the versatile, popular Philip Seymour Hoffman his Oscar for playing the tiny terror in Capote, but he was doing an impression. In Infamous ... a diminutive actor with a titanic talent named Toby Jones literally becomes the man himself. This is no lisping impersonation learned from watching old Johnny Carson shows: Mr. Jones moves into Truman's skin, heart and brains. Infamous shows you the man's soul. It is a monumental achievement of great artistry and depth. In some ways, the movie is better, too ... [it] is infinitely fascinating, cinematically breathtaking and largely impeccable. It proves that there's more than one way to tell a story and view a life. It is one hell of a beautiful movie to see and savor."

In Variety, David Rooney felt the film "doesn't measure up to its predecessor and seems unlikely to echo the attention it received ... In the central role, British thesp Toby Jones is a good physical match for Capote, getting his flamboyant mannerisms and creepy, nasal voice down. But unlike Philip Seymour Hoffman's Oscar-winning turn, there's no texture, no under-the-skin sense of the conflict between Capote's ambition for his book and his compassion for, and attraction to, Perry ... Sandra Bullock's understated performance as Capote's friend Lee is a high point here – wrapped in a cardigan and puffing on cigarettes, she creates a bracingly sturdy character of this plain-speaking, unfussy woman amid a cardboard gallery of flashy sophisticates."

Mick LaSalle of the San Francisco Chronicle observed, "By the standards of most pictures, this is intelligent, thoughtful filmmaking ... it's only against the exalted benchmark standard set by Capote that Infamous falls short ... It's a worthy film in its own right, with its own virtues ... Either through studying Lee or channeling someone else, Bullock adopts mannerisms and facial expressions that are not her own for this role and then works them into a well-crafted portrait of a highly internal, observant and deep-revolving spirit. It's the performance to take from the movie."

Jeff Klemzak penned two articles for the Los Angeles Times on the subject of the two biopics, arguing that Infamous, while covering the same theme as the award-winning Capote, "(a)nd as good as that film was, this one is better".

In The Village Voice, Robert Wilonsky stated the film "never comes close to approaching the quiet, devastating brilliance of Capote ... Which is not to say Infamous ... is a far inferior version ... it's just a lesser version, light in weight and absent the ache ... It's good, especially during its first half, just not good enough."

Steve Persall of the St. Petersburg Times rated the film B and added, "Infamous might have been viewed as one of this year's better films if Capote hadn't told the same story about the same characters a year ago and done it so well ... Infamous is inferior, although not drastically so, in almost every respect ... The most obvious comparisons are to be made about performances. Jones is a much more accurate physical representation of Capote than Hoffman, his high-pitched voice sounding a little more affected than his Oscar-winning predecessor. However, the relative shallowness of McGrath's screenplay doesn't offer as many emotional land mines for Jones to play. [He] delivers an uncanny impersonation, while Hoffman's portrayal was a studiously researched impression, a likely more challenging task. Call this race nearly a draw, with Hoffman simply crossing the finish line first."

In comparing this film to Capote, David Thomson of The Independent asked, "What does it have that's different? ... [It] has a gallery of Truman Capote's Manhattan friends, people who adored him without ever quite trusting him ... These cameos give a tone-perfect sense of Capote's life before In Cold Blood. He is placed as the phenomenon of culture, celebrity and outrage that he was."

Awards
Toby Jones won the London Film Critics' Circle Award for British Actor of the Year. He also won the Best Actor Award at the Ibiza International Film Festival. Daniel Craig was nominated for the Independent Spirit Award for Best Supporting Actor but lost to Alan Arkin in Little Miss Sunshine.

See also 

 Capote (film)
 Clutter family murders
 List of American films of 2006

References

External links
 
 
 
 

2006 films
2006 biographical drama films
2006 independent films
American biographical drama films
American LGBT-related films
Biographical films about writers
Films about capital punishment
Films based on biographies
Films set in Kansas
Films set in New York City
Films set in 1959
Films set in the 1950s
Films set in the 1960s
Biographical films about LGBT people
Marlin, Texas
Films with screenplays by Douglas McGrath
Films directed by Douglas McGrath
Films produced by Christine Vachon
Films scored by Rachel Portman
Killer Films films
Warner Independent Pictures films
Cultural depictions of Truman Capote
2006 drama films
2000s English-language films
2000s American films